Bewelcome (also Be Welcome) is an unincorporated community in Amite County, Mississippi, United States.

The settlement is located within the Homochitto National Forest.

History
The Woodland United Methodist Church was established east of the settlement in 1870.  A cemetery was also located there. The church closed in 2008.

Bewelcome had a post office in the early 1900s.

References

Unincorporated communities in Amite County, Mississippi
Unincorporated communities in Mississippi